The Colorado County Courthouse, built in 1890, is a historic government building located at 400 Spring Street in Columbus, Colorado County, Texas. It was designed in a combination of Classical Revival and Italianate styles of architecture by noted Houston architect Eugene T. Heiner, who designed at least nine other Texas courthouses. Colorado County's fourth courthouse, it originally had a central bell tower which was replaced before 1939 by a central domed Tiffany-style skylight. On July 12, 1976, it was added to the National Register of Historic Places. It was renovated in 2013, when historic colors were restored. It is still in use today as a courthouse.

See also

National Register of Historic Places listings in Colorado County, Texas
Recorded Texas Historic Landmarks in Colorado County
List of county courthouses in Texas

References

External links

Courthouses on the National Register of Historic Places in Texas
Neoclassical architecture in Texas
Government buildings completed in 1890
Buildings and structures in Colorado County, Texas
County courthouses in Texas
Clock towers in Texas
National Register of Historic Places in Colorado County, Texas